Castirla is a commune in the Haute-Corse department of France on the island of Corsica.

Geography

Climate
Castirla has a hot-summer mediterranean climate (Köppen climate classification Csa).

Population

See also
Communes of the Haute-Corse department

References

External links
 Personal website about Castirla, with pictures 

Communes of Haute-Corse
Haute-Corse communes articles needing translation from French Wikipedia